Nauclea latifolia, also known by its common name African peach, is a species of flowering plant in the genus Nauclea.

References

latifolia
Plants described in 1813